8/24/00 – Jones Beach, New York is a two-disc live album and the fortieth in a series of 72 live bootlegs released by the American alternative rock band Pearl Jam from the band's 2000 Binaural Tour. It was released along with the other official bootlegs from the first North American leg of the tour on February 27, 2001.

Overview
The album was recorded on August 24, 2000 in Wantagh, New York at Jones Beach Amphitheater. It was selected by the band as one of 18 "Ape/Man" shows from the tour, which, according to bassist Jeff Ament, were shows the band found "really exciting." AllMusic gave it one and a half out of a possible five stars. Allmusic staff writer Zac Johnson said, "The last quarter of the show really shines, but doesn't fully make up for the mistakes made during the majority of the concert." "Daughter"/"It's OK" from this show appears on the Touring Band 2000 DVD.

Track listing

Disc one
"Of the Girl" (Stone Gossard) – 4:57
"Breakerfall" (Eddie Vedder) – 2:38
"Corduroy" (Dave Abbruzzese, Jeff Ament, Gossard, Mike McCready, Vedder) – 4:27
"Grievance" (Vedder) – 3:12
"Last Exit" (Abbruzzese, Ament, Gossard, McCready, Vedder) – 2:35
"Do the Evolution" (Gossard, Vedder) – 3:43
"Dissident" (Abbruzzese, Ament, Gossard, McCready, Vedder) – 5:07
"Rival" (Gossard) – 3:18
"Given to Fly" (McCready, Vedder) – 3:53
"Nothing as It Seems" (Ament) – 5:34
"Light Years" (Gossard, McCready, Vedder) – 4:51
"Even Flow" (Vedder, Gossard) – 5:24
"Daughter" (Abbruzzese, Ament, Gossard, McCready, Vedder) – 7:07
"Lukin" (Vedder) – 0:58
"Insignificance" (Vedder) – 4:36
"Betterman" (Vedder) – 4:35
"Porch" (Vedder) – 4:47

Disc two
"Encore Break" – 0:51
"Spin the Black Circle" (Abbruzzese, Ament, Gossard, McCready, Vedder) – 2:40
"Hail, Hail" (Gossard, Vedder, Ament, McCready) – 3:29
"I Got Id" (Vedder) – 4:38
"Elderly Woman Behind the Counter in a Small Town" (Abbruzzese, Ament, Gossard, McCready, Vedder) – 4:51
"Crazy Mary" (Victoria Williams) – 5:00
"Black" (Vedder, Gossard) – 7:26
"Rearviewmirror" (Abbruzzese, Ament, Gossard, McCready, Vedder) – 8:58
"Last Kiss" (Wayne Cochran) – 5:03
"Yellow Ledbetter" (Ament, McCready, Vedder) – 7:32

Personnel
Pearl Jam
Jeff Ament – bass guitar, design concept
Matt Cameron – drums
Stone Gossard – guitars
Mike McCready – guitars
Eddie Vedder – vocals, guitars

Production
John Burton – engineering
Brett Eliason – mixing
Brad Klausen – design and layout

References

Pearl Jam Official Bootlegs
2001 live albums
Epic Records live albums